Redło may refer to either of two villages in Poland that were in Germany before 1945:

Redło, Świdwin County
Redło, Goleniów County